Endla Vellend (since 1975 Lipre; born 30 December 1945, in Tallinn) is an Estonian archer.

In 1968 she graduated from Tallinn Polytechnical Institute's Department of Chemistry.

From 1972 to 1974 she was a member of Soviet Union team.

From 1965 to 1973 she became the eleven-time Estonian champion in different arching disciplines.

In 1974 she was named to Estonian Athlete of the Year.

References

Living people
1945 births
Estonian female archers
Sportspeople from Tallinn
Tallinn University alumni
20th-century Estonian women